Robert William Frith (1892–1939) was an English professional footballer who played as a half back in the Football League for Rotherham County, South Shields and Derby County.

Personal life 
Frith was married with two children and at one time worked as a furnace man in Sheffield. On 16 December 1914, four months after the outbreak of the First World War, Frith enlisted in the Football Battalion of the Middlesex Regiment. He had two toes amputated in May 1915 and was transferred to the regiment's 27th (Reserve) Battalion in November 1915. Frith was released from the army during the following month to work in a munitions factory in Sheffield. He was posted to the Middlesex Regiment Depot in Aldershot in March 1916 and was discharged from the army in January 1919.

Career statistics

References

1892 births
1939 deaths
People from Derbyshire Dales (district)
Footballers from Derbyshire
English footballers
English Football League players
Association football midfielders
Bradford (Park Avenue) A.F.C. players
Sheffield United F.C. players
British Army personnel of World War I
Middlesex Regiment soldiers
Southern Football League players
Luton Town F.C. players
Derby County F.C. players
South Shields F.C. (1889) players
Rotherham County F.C. players
Mansfield Town F.C. players
Mid Rhondda F.C. players
Rochdale A.F.C. players
Midland Football League players